Sandwick (IPA:[ˈs̪aun̴̪t̪əvɪkʲ]) is a village in the Scottish Outer Hebrides, on the Isle of Lewis and a quasi-suburb of Stornoway. Sandwick is situated within the parish of Stornoway.

Education 

Sandwick is home to one of the three principal primary schools for the Stornoway area, Sandwickhill School.

See also 
 Lewis and Harris
 History of the Outer Hebrides

References

External links 

 Visitor's guide for the Isle of Lewis
 Website of the Western Isles Council with links to other resources
 Disabled access to Lewis for residents and visitors
 
 A Guide to living in the Outer Hebrides, with most information pertaining to Lewis
Canmore - Sandwick, Cemetery site record
Canmore - Lewis, Sandwick site record

Villages in the Isle of Lewis